West Park Hospital is a modern NHS adult psychiatric hospital in Darlington, County Durham, England. It is managed by the Tees, Esk and Wear Valleys NHS Foundation Trust.

History
The hospital was procured under a Private Finance Initiative ('PFI') contract, to replace outdated facilitates at the Pierremont Unit and the Beaumont Ward at Darlington Memorial Hospital and at the Gables Unit in Sedgefield, in 2002. It was built at a cost of £16 million and was officially opened by Alan Milburn, Minister for the Cabinet Office, in December 2004. At the time of opening the new facility had 24 rooms for older people, 60 bedrooms for acute adult patients and 10 intensive care beds.

In 2009 the Trust decided to exercise a break clause in the contract allowing it to terminate the contract early by paying £18 million up front.

See also
 List of hospitals in England

Notes

References

External links
 Tees, Esk and Wear Valleys NHS Foundation Trust

Hospital buildings completed in 2004
NHS hospitals in England
Hospitals in County Durham
Buildings and structures in Darlington